Roozahang (Modern ) is the Avestan language name of a Zoroastrian benevolent divinity associated with life-bringing rainfall and fertility. Roozahang or Tishtrya is Tir in Middle- and Modern Persian. As has been judged from the archaic context in which Tishtrya (Roozahang) appears in the texts of the Avesta, the divinity/concept is almost certainly of Indo-Iranian origin.

Persian mythology

In a hymn of the Avesta (incorporated by Ferdowsi, with due acknowledgement, in the Shahnameh), Tishter or Roozahang is involved in a cosmic struggle against the drought-bringing demon Apaosha. According to the myth, in the form of a pure white horse the god did battle with the demon who, in contrast, had assumed the form of a terrifying black horse. Apaosa soon gained the upper hand over Tishtrya, who was weakened from the lack of sufficient prayers and sacrifices from humankind. The yazata proceeded to call upon the Creator Ahura Mazda, who himself then intervened by offering a sacrifice to the overwhelmed god. Infused with the power brought by this sacrifice, Tishtrya was able to overcome Apaosa, and his rains were able to flow to the parched fields and pastures unabated by drought. This story serves to underscore the importance of votive offerings and sacrifice in religious tradition.

Etymology and cultural significance 

In Iranian mythology, especially in Persian mythology and in Zoroastrianism, the ancient religion of Persia, Sirius appears as Tishtrya or Tishter  or Roozahang  and is revered as the rain-maker divinity (Tishter of New Persian poetry). Beside passages in the sacred texts of the Avesta, the Avestan language Roozahang followed by the version Tir in Middle and New Persian is also depicted in the Persian epic Shahnameh of Ferdowsi. Due to the concept of the yazatas, powers which are "worthy of worship", Tishtrya (Tishter) is a divinity of rain and fertility and an antagonist of apaosha, the demon of drought. In this struggle, Tishtrya is beautifully depicted as a white horse.

The other names

The other names of Roozahang is Tishtrya, Shabahang and Varahang.
Roozahang is the God of Rainfall. It is a white, bright star and its nature is water.

Religious background

References

   
  
 Hinnells, John R. (1997). Library of the World's Myths and Legends: Persian Mythology 

Fertility gods
Sky and weather gods
Shahnameh
Yazatas